Ivan Kopecký (born 29 January 1946) is a Czech football manager and former player.

As a player, Kopecký played five seasons in the Czechoslovak First League for Slavia Prague and one season for Frýdek-Místek, making a total of 137 league appearances and scoring 4 goals.

As a coach, Kopecký led several Czech football clubs. His biggest success as a coach was with TJ Vítkovice. Kopecký led the club in the 1985/1986 season to the Czechoslovak First League championship. Thanks to this achievement, he was selected by the football association as the Czechoslovak Coach of the Year in 1986.

References

External links
  SK Slavia Praha profile

1946 births
Living people
Czechoslovak footballers
Czech football managers
Czechoslovak football managers
SK Slavia Prague players
Czech First League managers
SK Slavia Prague managers
FC Baník Ostrava managers
FK Vítkovice managers
Association football midfielders
FK Frýdek-Místek players
FK Drnovice managers